Thomas, Tom and Tommy Morrison may refer to:

Politics
 Thomas David Morrison (1796–1856), Canadian doctor and politician
 Thomas Fletcher Morrison (1808–1886), sailor, farmer and political figure in Nova Scotia, Canada
 Thomas H. Morison (1838–1884), warden of the Borough of Norwalk, Connecticut
 Thomas Morison, Lord Morison (1868–1945), Scottish politician and judge
 Tom Morrison (politician) (born 1975), Illinois state legislator
 Tommy Morrison (politician) (born 1975), Guam legislator

Sports
 Tom Morrison (baseball) (1869–1902), American baseball player
 Tommy Morrison (footballer, born 1874) (1874–1940), Irish footballer
 Tommy Morrison (footballer, born 1943), Scottish footballer
 Tom Morrison (footballer) (1904–1973), Scottish footballer
 Tom Morrison (rugby union) (1913–1985), New Zealand rugby union player and administrator
 Tommy Morrison (1969–2013), American boxer

Other
 Thomas Morrison (actor) (born 1983), English television actor

See also
Thomas Moryson (died 1592), MP